The Glasgow Humane Society was founded in 1790. It is the oldest continuing lifeboat service in the world. The aims and objectives of the Society are:

Preservation of human life in and around the waterways of Greater Glasgow.
Provision of lifeboat / safety services where and when requested.
The search and recovery of persons from the River Clyde where and when requested by Police Scotland
Advice to councils, emergency services, universities and schools businesses, riverside users and general members of the public on safety and accident prevention on waterways.
Education of the public in water safety.

The Society is contracted by the council to maintain the provision of Life Belts along the Clyde and assist in Search and Locate missions for missing people.

The current Officer is William Graham.

In 2012, the society travelled to London where they had been invited to participate in the Queen's Diamond Jubilee Regatta

The Bennie, a lifeboat custom designed by Benjamin "Bennie" Parsonage, is on display in the Riverside Museum. Several of the Society's boats are replicas of the Bennie, as it is the fastest boat that can still be tipped far enough to allow a person to be lifted over the side.

References 

Organisations based in Scotland